Specklinia cactantha is a species of orchid native to Panama and Colombia. It was first formally named Pleurothallis cactantha in 1976 and transferred to the genus Specklinia in 2001.

References

cactantha
Flora of Panama
Flora of Colombia